Radio Capital is an Italian private radio station, was founded in May 1977 and is owned by the Gruppo Editoriale L'Espresso (ultimately by EXOR owned by the Agnelli-family) and began broadcasting in 1985.

Broadcast FTA on Hot Bird, on SKY Italia channel 713 and on tivùsat channel 622.

Programming
Capital Party (hosted by Andrea Prezioso)
Risponde Zucconi (hosted by Vittorio Zucconi)

External links
 Official Website

Free-to-air
Mass media in Rome
Radio stations in Italy
Radio stations established in 1977
GEDI Gruppo Editoriale
Classic hits radio stations
Adult contemporary radio stations